Sunwah Tower is a high-rise Grade A office building in Ho Chi Minh City, Vietnam designed by Los Angeles architects Archeon Group. It is located at 115 Nguyen Hue. The building comprises 21 floors and 3 basements used for parking. There are 6 elevators used for customers and 1 elevator for service purpose only. The building opened in 1995 and was the tallest building in Vietnam for that year with 92 meters until it was surpassed by Saigon Centre with 106 meters.

The building was originally developed and owned by Sun Wah Group and Marubeni. In 2018, a subsidiary of Nomura Real Estate Holdings purchased a 24 percent stake from Marubeni.

General information about Sunwah Tower:
 Total net area: 20 800 sq m
 Typical net floor plate: 1 166 sq m
 Ceiling Height: 2.7m
 Total number of lifts: 6 passenger lifts and 1 service lift
 Air conditioning: Centralised
 Fire security: International standard sprinklers, smoke detectors and fire alarm system

References

Skyscrapers in Ho Chi Minh City
Skyscraper office buildings in Vietnam
Office buildings completed in 1995